John R. Anderson may refer to:

John R. Anderson (minister) (1818–1863), founder and minister of African Baptist Churches
John Robert Anderson (chemist) (1928–2007), Australian chemist/materials scientist
John Robert Anderson (psychologist) (born 1947), Canadian psychologist and computer scientist
John Rogers Anderson (born 1941), Canadian admiral and ambassador to NATO
 John Roy Anderson, known as Jon Anderson (born 1944), lead singer of the British band Yes

See also
 John Anderson (disambiguation)